The Irish League in season 1908–09 comprised 8 teams, and Linfield won the championship.

League standings

Results

References
Northern Ireland - List of final tables (RSSSF)

1908-09
Ireland
Irish